Le Ciel sur la tête may refer to:

Heaven on One's Head, a 1965 French film directed by Yves Ciampi,
On Your Head, a 2001 Canadian film directed by André Melançon and Geneviève Lefebvre,
Times Have Been Better, a 2006 French television film directed by Régis Musset.